Fathabad (also Romanized as Fatḩābād) is a village in Azimiyeh Rural District, in the Central District of Ray County, Tehran Province, Iran. At the 2006 census, its population was 404, in 111 families.

References 

Populated places in Ray County, Iran